Pompallier Catholic College is a Catholic co-educational secondary school located in the suburb of Maunu in Whangarei, New Zealand. It is one of nine secondary schools within the Marist network. Pompallier Catholic College is named after Bishop Jean Baptiste Francois Pompallier who led the first group of Catholic Missionaries from Lyons, France, to New Zealand. The patron saint of the college is John the Baptist. Students of Pompallier Catholic College are colloquially known as Pompallians.

History
Pompallier College is named after Bishop Jean Baptiste Pompallier who led the first group of Catholic Missionaries to New Zealand, arriving in the Hokianga with Fr Servant and Br Michel a Marist Priest and Brother in 1838. He was the first Catholic Bishop of New Zealand; Bishop Pompallier of the Diocese of Auckland.

The school was founded in 1971 after fund-raising among Northland parishes. It started as a private Boys' Boarding School owned and administered by the Society of Mary. The school became co-educational in 1977, closed the boarding facility in 1981 and in the same year became a state-integrated secondary school owned by the Diocese of Auckland and administered by a Board of Trustees. An Attached Intermediate was opened in 1995 and Form 1–7 status was achieved in 1997. It is now known as a Year 7–13 state-integrated co-educational secondary school.

Controversy
In August 2012, principal Richard Stanton published an article in the school newsletter which opposed  Louisa Wall's Marriage (Definition of Marriage) Amendment Bill, which would legalise same-sex marriage in New Zealand. A staff member was suspended, and later dismissed, for not abiding to the terms of his contract. Some students and parents also protested against the article.

Abuse 
At least one priest who taught at Pompallier College is alleged to have abused children.

 Father Phil Roberts, Society of Mary priest and former principal of Pompallier College in Whangarei and St Augustine's College, Whanganui, mentioned in the NZ Royal Commission of Inquiry into Abuse in Care hearings in March 2021 as having abused children.

School Structure
The school is divided into four houses. The house patrons have been chosen by students on the basis of their connection with Te Tai Tokerau and/or the Colleges Catholic and Marist charism. They are:

TATE Green house. Named after Pa Henare Tate

AUBERT Blue house. Named after Sister Suzanne Aubert

CHAVOIN Yellow house. Named after Jeanne-Marie Chavoin

COLIN Red house. Named after Jean-Claude Colin

References

Educational institutions established in 1971
Schools in Whangārei
Catholic secondary schools in New Zealand
Secondary schools in the Northland Region
1971 establishments in New Zealand